New York's 122nd State Assembly district is one of the 150 districts in the New York State Assembly. It has been represented by Brian Miller since 2023, succeeding Joe Angelino, who represents District 121 following the 2021-22 redistricting process. Miller previously represented District 101.

Geography

2020s 
District 122 contains portions of Herkimer, Madison, Oneida and Otsego counties.

2010s 
District 122 contains portions of Broome, Chenango, Delaware and Otsego counties.

Recent election results

2022

2020

2018

2016

2014

2012

References 

122
Broome County, New York
Chenango County, New York
Delaware County, New York
Otsego County, New York